Wrangel or Wrangell is a Germanic surname. Notable people with the surname include:
 Wrangel family, or Wrangell, a Baltic German noble family, including a list of notable family members
Basil Wrangell (1906–1977), Italian film and television editor and director 
Herman Wrangel ( 1585–1643), Swedish field-marshal and statesman
Carl Gustaf Wrangel (1613–1676), Swedish field-marshal and statesman 
Carl Henrik Wrangel (1681–1755), Swedish field marshal
Ferdinand von Wrangel (1797–1870), Baltic German explorer and admiral, governor of Russian Alaska
Friedrich Graf von Wrangel (1784–1877), Prussian-field marshal
Hakon Magne Valdemar Wrangell (1859–1942), Norwegian ship owner and politician
Hedda Wrangel (1792–1833), Swedish composer
Herman Wrangel (diplomat) (1857–1934), Swedish diplomat
Herman Wrangel (1859–1938), lieutenant-general and commander of the Swedish Coastal Artillery
Margarete von Wrangell (1877–1932), Baltic German agricultural chemist and professor 
Olaf von Wrangel (1928–2009), German politician
Pyotr Wrangel (1878–1928), major-general in the Imperial Russian Army and military commander in the White movement
Waldemar von Wrangel (1641–1675), Swedish lieutenant-general
Wilhelm von Wrangell (1894–1976), Estonian politician

See also